Economic warfare or economic war is an economic strategy utilized by belligerent nations with the goal of weakening the economy of other states. This is primarily achieved by the use of economic blockades. Ravaging the crops of the enemy is a classic method, used for thousands of years.

In military operations, economic warfare may reflect economic policy followed as a part of open or covert operations, cyber operations, information operations during or preceding a war.  Economic warfare aims to capture or otherwise to control the supply of critical economic resources so friendly military and intelligence agencies can use them and enemy forces cannot.

The concept of economic warfare is most applicable to total war, which involves not only the armed forces of enemy countries, but also mobilized war-economies. In such a situation, damage to an enemy's economy is damage to that enemy's ability to fight a war. Scorched-earth policies may deny resources to an invading enemy.

Policies and measures in economic warfare may include blockade, blacklisting, preclusive purchasing, rewards and the capturing or the control of enemy assets or supply lines. Other policies, such tariff discrimination,  sanctions, the suspension of aid, the freezing of capital assets, the prohibition of investment and other capital flows, and expropriation,
even without armed military war, may be referred to as economic warfare.

History

Crusades
In his Book on the Recovery of the Holy Land, Fidentius of Padua provides prescriptions for economic warfare to be waged against the Mamluk sultanate of Egypt in furtherance of the Crusades. He envisions a fleet of 40–50 galleys to enforce a blockade on trade between Europe and Egypt. He sees this trade as helping Egypt in two ways: from Europe it obtains war materiel (iron, tin, timber, oil) and from Asia dues on goods brought in via the Red Sea for trade to Europe. If this spice trade were deflected from the Red Sea to Mongol Persia, Egypt would be deprived of customs duties and would also lose export markets because of the reduction in shipping. This may also make it unable to afford more slave soldiers imported from the Black Sea.

American Civil War

Union forces in the American Civil War had the challenge of occupying and controlling the 11 states of the Confederacy, a vast area larger than Western Europe. The Confederate economy proved surprisingly vulnerable.<ref>Roger L. Ransom, "The economics of the Civil War." EH. net Encyclopedia 24 (2001) online].</ref> 

Guerrilla warfare in the American Civil War was supported by a large fraction of the Confederate population that provided food, horses, and hiding places for official and unofficial Confederate units. Before the war, most passenger and freight traffic moved by water through the river system or coastal ports. Confederate railroads were already inadequate and suffered much damage. Travel became much more difficult. The Union Navy took control of much of the seacoast and the main rivers such as the Mississippi River and the Tennessee River, using the Mississippi River Squadron of powerful small gunboats. Land transportation was contested, as Confederate supporters tried to block shipments of munitions, reinforcements and supplies through West Virginia, Kentucky, and Tennessee to Union forces to the south. Bridges were burned, railroad tracks torn up, and telegraph lines were cut. Both sides did the same and effectively ruined the infrastructure of the Confederacy.Daniel E.  Sutherland,  A Savage Conflict: The Decisive Role of Guerillas in the American Civil War (U of North Carolina Press, 2009). online

The Confederacy in 1861 had 297 towns and cities with a total population of 835,000 people, 162 of which were at one point occupied by Union forces with a total population of 681,000 people. In practically every case, infrastructure was damaged, and trade and economic activity was disrupted for a while. Eleven cities were severely damaged by war action, including Atlanta, Charleston, Columbia, and Richmond. The rate of damage in smaller towns was much lower, with severe damage to 45 out of a total of 830.

Farms were in disrepair, and the prewar stock of horses, mules, and cattle was much depleted; 40% of the South's livestock had been killed. The South's farms were not highly mechanized, but the value of farm implements and machinery in the 1860 census was $81 million and had been reduced by 40% by 1870. The transportation infrastructure lay in ruins, with little railroad or riverboat service available to move crops and animals to market. Railroad mileage was located mostly in rural areas and over two thirds of the South's rails, bridges, rail yards, repair shops, and rolling stock were in areas reached by Union armies, which systematically destroyed what they could. Even in untouched areas, the lack of maintenance and repair, the absence of new equipment, the heavy overuse, and the relocation of equipment by the Confederacy from remote areas to the war zone ensured the system would be ruined at war's end.

The enormous cost of the Confederate war effort took a high toll on the South's economic infrastructure. The direct costs to the Confederacy in human capital, government expenditures, and physical destruction totaled perhaps $3.3 billion. By 1865, the Confederate dollar was worthless because of high inflation, and people in the South had to resort to bartering for goods or services to use scarce Union dollars. With the emancipation of the slaves, the entire economy of the South had to be rebuilt. Having lost their enormous investment in slaves, white planters had minimal capital to pay freedmen workers to bring in crops. As a result, a system of sharecropping was developed in which landowners broke up large plantations and rented small lots to the freedmen and their families. The main feature of the Southern economy changed from an elite minority of landed gentry slaveholders to a tenant farming agriculture system.  The disruption of finance, trade, services, and transportation nodes severely disrupted the prewar agricultural system and forced Southerners to turn to barter. The entire region was impoverished for generations.

World War I

The British used their greatly-superior Royal Navy to cause a tight blockade of Germany and a close monitoring of shipments to neutral countries to prevent them from being transshipped to there. Germany could not find enough food since its younger farmers were all in the army, and the desperate Germans were eating turnips by the winter of 1916–17.The alternative theories of Nicholas A. Lambert, Planning Armageddon: British Economic Warfare and the First World War (2012) are refuted by  John W. Coogan, "The Short-War Illusion Resurrected: The Myth of Economic Warfare as the British Schlieffen Plan," Journal of Strategic Studies  (2015)  38:7, 1045-1064, DOI: 10.1080/01402390.2015.1005451 US shipping was sometimes seized, and Washington protested. The British paid monetary compensation so that the American protests would not escalate into serious trouble.

World War II

Clear examples of economic warfare occurred during World War II when the Allied powers followed such policies to deprive the Axis economies of critical resources. The British Royal Navy again blockaded Germany although with much more difficulty than in 1914. The US Navy, especially its submarines, cut off shipments of oil and food to Japan.

In turn, Germany attempted to damage the Allied war effort via submarine warfare: the sinking of transport ships carrying supplies, raw materials, and essential war-related items such as food and oil. As the Allied air forces grew, they mounted an Oil campaign of World War II to deprive Germany of fuel.

Neutral countries continue to trade with both sides. The Royal Navy could not stop land trade, so the allies made other effort to cut off sales to Germany of critical minerals such as tungsten, chromium, mercury and iron ore from Spain, Portugal, Turkey, Sweden and elsewhere.  Germany wanted Spain to enter the war but they could not agree to terms. To keep Germany and Spain apart, Britain used a carrot-and-stick approach.  Britain provided oil and closely monitored Spain's export trade. It outbid Germany for the wolfram, whose price soared, and by 1943, wolfram was Spain's biggest export-earner. Britain's cautious treatment of Spain brought conflict with the more aggressive American policy. In the Wolfram Crisis of 1944 Washington cut off oil supplies but then agreed with London's requests to resume oil shipments.James W. Cortada, "Spain and the second world war." Journal of Contemporary History 5.4 (1970): 65-75.  Portugal feared a German-Spanish invasion, but when that became unlikely in 1944, it virtually joined the Allies.

 Cold War 
During the Malayan Emergency (1948–1960), the British military deployed herbicides and defoliants in the Malaysian countryside (including crop fields) in order to deprive Malayan National Liberation Army (MNLA) insurgents of cover, potential sources of food and to flush them out of the jungle. The herbicides and defoliants deployed by the British contained Trioxone, an ingredient which was also formed part of the chemical composition of the Agent Orange herbicide used by the U.S. military during the Vietnam War. Deployment of herbicides and defoliants served the dual purpose of thinning jungle trails to prevent ambushes and destroying crop fields in regions where the MNLA was active to deprive them of potential sources of food. Herbicides and defoliants were also sprayed from Royal Air Force (RAF) aircraft.

On 17 November 1953, the Greek National Intelligence Service (KYP) proposed conducting tax audits on suspected communist book publishers and cinema owners, censoring Soviet movies and promoting Soviet films of particularly low quality. In 1959, KYP launched exhibitions of Soviet products in Volos, Thessaloniki and Piraeus. The bulk of the products were cheap and defective, purposefully selected to tarnish the Soviet Union's image.

As the British did in Malaya, the goal of the U.S. was to defoliate rural/forested land, depriving guerrillas of food and concealment and clearing sensitive areas such as around base perimeters. Samuel P. Huntington argued that the program was also a part of a general policy of forced draft urbanization, which aimed to destroy the ability of peasants to support themselves in the countryside, forcing them to flee to the U.S.-dominated cities, depriving the guerrillas of their rural support base.

 French Economic Warfare School 

Christian Harbulot, the director of the Economic Warfare School in Paris, provides an historical reconstruction of the economic balance of power between states. In his study, he demonstrates that the strategies that states put in place to increase their economic power and their impact on the international balance of power can be interpreted only by the concept of economic warfare.

 Economic sanctions 
The Covenant of the League of Nations provided for military and economic sanctions against aggressor states, and the idea of economic sanctions was regarded as a great innovation. However, economic sanctions without military ones failed to dissuade Italy from conquering Abbysinia.

In 1973–1974, the Arab nations imposed an oil embargo against the United States, United Kingdom, Canada, South Africa, Japan, and other industrialized nations that supported Israel during the Yom Kippur War of October 1973. Results included  the 1973 oil crisis and a sharp rise in prices but not an end to support for Israel.

Many United States sanctions have been imposed since the middle 20th century.
 United States embargo against Cuba
 Countering America's Adversaries Through Sanctions Act
 Sanctions against North Korea
Fortress economics or a fortress economy is a phrase used in relation to the defense and sustenance of a countries' economy amidst international sanctions. (The term has been used in reference to Russia in 2022, Taiwan with relation to China-US relations, and Europe.)

 See also 

 References 

Further reading
 Baldwin, David A. Economic Statecraft (Princeton UP, 1985).
 Clark, J. Maurice et al. Readings in the Economics Of War (1918) 703pp; short excerpts from primary sources  on a very wide rance of economic warfare topics  online free
 Dobson, Alan P. U.S. Economic Statecraft for Survival 1933–1991 (2003).  excerpt 
 Duffett, Rachel,  and Ina Zweiniger-Bargielowska, eds. Food and War in Twentieth Century Europe (2016)
 Einzig, Paul. Economic Warfare 1939-1940 (1942) online free
 Esno, Tyler. "Reagan’s Economic War on the Soviet Union," Diplomatic History (2018) 42#2 pp 281–304.
 Christian Harbulot,La machine de guerre économique, Economica,Paris, 1992.
 Christian Harbulot,La guerre économique, PUF,Paris, 2011
 Christian Harbulot,Le manuel de l'intelligence économique, PUF,Paris, 2012
 Christian Harbulo,Techniques offensives et guerre économique, éditions La Bourdonnaye,Paris, 2014.
 Christian Harbulot,Le manuel de l'intelligence économique, comprendre la guerre économique, PUF,Paris, 2015
 Christian Harbulot,L'art de la guerre economique,Editions Va Press,Versailles,2018 
 Jack, D. T. Studies in economic warfare (1940), covers Napoleonic wars, laws, WWI and 1939-40 online free
 Jackson, Ian. The Economic Cold War: America, Britain and East-West Trade, 1948–63 (2001)
 Joes,  Anthony James. America and guerrilla warfare (2015); Covers nine major wars from the 1770s to the 21st century. 
 McDermott, John. "Total War and the Merchant State: Aspects of British Economic Warfare against Germany, 1914-16." Canadian Journal of History 21.1 (1986): 61–76.
 Siney, Marion C. The Allied blockade of Germany, 1914-1916'' (1957) [https://archive.org/details/alliedblockadeof00sine online free

External links

 
Military economics